Church of St Maurice (also known as the Church of St Thomas at Plympton St Maurice) is located in Plympton, Devon, England. Dating to the 15th century, it is now a Grade II* listed building. The church is of Church of England denomination.

The church tower was rebuilt in 1446 and restored in 1878 by E. H. Sedding. The 1905 nave roof is a copy of the original by Hine and Ogders.

There is a monument to Joshua Reynolds, by James Hine, erected in 1904. It features a portrait medallion by F. Derwent Wood.

The boundary wall and lychgate of the church are Grade II listed.

The church's former rectory stands across the former marketplace at 9 Fore Street. The church hall is located at 10 Market Road in Plympton.

References

External links

Grade II* listed buildings in Devon
15th-century establishments in England
15th-century church buildings in England
15th-century churches
Grade II* listed churches in Devon
Buildings and structures in Plympton, Devon